Xylosma ruiziana is a species of flowering plant in the family Salicaceae. It is endemic to Peru.

References

ruiziana
Endemic flora of Peru
Data deficient plants
Taxa named by Hermann Otto Sleumer
Taxonomy articles created by Polbot